The Millerson Case is a 1947 drama directed by George Archainbaud, starring Warner Baxter, Nancy Saunders and Clem Bevans. In the 8th film of Columbia's Crime Doctor series, Dr. Robert Ordway (Warner Baxter) is vacationing in the Blue Ridge Mountains district of West Virginia when a Typhoid fever epidemic breaks out. Three deaths occur, with the first two being typhoid-caused. The death of the third person is from poisoning.

Plot summary

In the 8th film of Columbia's "Crime Doctor" series, Dr. Robert Ordway (Warner Baxter), is vacationing in the Blue Ridge Mountains district of West Virginia when a typhoid epidemic breaks out. Three deaths occur with the first two being typhoid-caused but the death of the third person, Ward Beachey, is a case of poisoning. Ordway learns that Beachey was the town Romeo with many enemies and that most of those had access to the poison. Doc Millerson, who has a suspicion who the guilty party is, receives a note in a woman's handwriting requesting a meeting at the river bank. He goes there and is killed in an ambush by a rifle shot. Following the note as a clue, Ordway visits the house of Ezra Minnich and traps Minnich's young daughter into confessing that her father made her write the note. Minnich confesses he had killed Beachey for trying to break up his home and Doc Millerson because he suspected him.

Cast
 Warner Baxter as Dr. Robert Ordway  
 Nancy Saunders as Belle Englehart  
 Clem Bevans as Sheriff Luke Akers  
 Griff Barnett as Doc Sam Millerson  
 Paul Guilfoyle as Jud Rookstool  
 James Bell as Ezra Minnich  
 Addison Richards as Dr. Wickersham  
 Mark Dennis as Bije Minnich  
 Robert Kellard as Dr. Prescott (as Robert Stephens)

References

External links
 
 
 
 

Films directed by George Archainbaud
American drama films
1947 drama films
1947 films
Columbia Pictures films
American black-and-white films
Crime Doctor (character) films
1940s American films